Jiří Bartoška (born 24 March 1947) is a Czech theatre, television, and film actor and president of the Karlovy Vary International Film Festival. His most notable film roles include performances in Sekal Has to Die (1998), All My Loved Ones (1999), and Tiger Theory (2016), as well as the television series Sanitka (1984) and Neviditelní (2014).

Biography

Education and career
Bartoška was born in Děčín and went to high school in Pardubice. After graduating, he attended the Janáček Academy of Music and Performing Arts in Brno. He joined the Divadlo Husa na provázku theatre in Brno and in 1973, moved to northern Czechoslovakia to the Činoherní studio Ústí nad Labem theatre, where he stayed until 1978. At this point, the actor moved to Prague, where he began a residency at the Theatre on the Balustrade. In 1991, together with a number of colleagues, Bartoška transferred to the newly established Divadlo Bez zábradlí theatre. He has also been a successful film and television actor, and has lent his voice to a number of documentary films.

Since 1994, Bartoška has been president of the Karlovy Vary International Film Festival, where he collaborates mainly with film critic and journalist Eva Zaoralová.

In 2000, he won a Czech Lion for Best Supporting Actor for his performance in All My Loved Ones. He had been nominated for the same award the previous year for his performance in Sekal Has to Die, though he didn't win.

Political activity
During the Communist era in Czechoslovakia, Bartoška was a signatory of the 1977 Anticharter, in opposition to the Charter 77 civic initiative co-written by dissident and playwright Václav Havel. In 1989, in a seeming about-face, Bartoška signed Několik vět, a document put forward by Charter 77; he also joined a petition for Havel's release from prison. The same year, he co-founded the Civic Forum political movement with Havel. At a demonstration on 10 December 1989, he announced his candidacy for president of the Czechoslovak Socialist Republic.

In 2016, responding to a number of statements made by president Miloš Zeman, as well as the Prohlášení čtyř document, which criticized the meeting between then-culture minister Daniel Herman and the Dalai Lama, Bartoška and Vojtěch Dyk incited the Czech public to civil unrest.

Personal life
Bartoška and his wife Andrea have a daughter, Kateřina, and a son, Jan.

Selected filmography

References

External links

 

1947 births
Living people
People from Děčín
Czech male film actors
Karlovy Vary International Film Festival
Czech male television actors
Janáček Academy of Music and Performing Arts alumni
Czech Lion Awards winners